The XXII 2018 Pan Am Badminton Championships was a continental championships tournament of badminton in Pan America. This tournament was held as two events in different countries. From 15 to 18 February, the team event was held in Tacarigua, Trinidad and Tobago.  From 26 to 29 April, the individual event was held in Guatemala City, Guatemala.

Tournament
The team event of 2018 Pan Am Badminton Championships officially Male & Female Pan Am Team Continental Championships 2018, was a continental stage tournament of Thomas and Uber Cups, and also to crown the best men's and women's badminton team in Pan America. This event organized by the Badminton Pan Am and Trinidad and Tobago Badminton Association. 15 teams, consisting of 8 men's teams and 7 women's teams entered the tournament.

The individual event of Pan Am Badminton Championships was an individual continental championships tournament of badminton, to crown the best male and female players and pairs in Pan America. The point of this tournament graded as BWF World Tour Super 100 event. This event was organized by the Badminton Pan Am and Federacion Nacional de Badminton Guatemala.

Venue
The team event was held at National Racket Centre in the city of Tacarigua, Trinidad and Tobago.
The individual event venue will be held at the Teodoro Palacios Flores Gymnasium.

Point distribution
Below is the tables with the point distribution for each phase of the individual event tournament based on the BWF points system for the Pan Am Badminton Championships.

Medalists

Medal table

Team events

Individual events

Team events

Men's team

Group A

Group B

Knockout stage

Fifth place game

Third place game

Final standings

Women's team

Group A

Group B

Knockout stage

Third place game

Final standings

Individual event

Men's singles

Seeds

 Ygor Coelho de Oliveira (champion)
 Kevin Cordón (semifinals)
 Jason Ho-shue (final)
 Osleni Guerrero (semifinals)
 Leodannis Martínez (third round)
 Job Castillo (quarterfinals)
 Lino Muñoz (quarterfinals)
 Daniel la Torre Regal (third round)

Finals

Top half

Section 1

Section 2

Bottom half

Section 3

Section 4

Women's singles

Seeds

 Michelle Li (champion)
 Rachel Honderich (final)
 Brittney Tam (semifinals)
 Daniela Macías (third round)
 Jamie Hsu (quarterfinals)
 Tahimara Oropeza (third round)
 Disha Gupta (quarterfinals)
 Fernanda Saponara Rivva (second round)

Finals

Top half

Section 1

Section 2

Bottom half

Section 3

Section 4

Men's doubles

Seeds

 Jason Ho-shue / Nyl Yakura (champions)
 Phillip Chew / Ryan Chew (final)
 Job Castillo / Lino Muñoz (semifinals)
 Jonathan Solís / Rodolfo Ramírez (semifinals)

Finals

Top half

Section 1

Section 2

Bottom half

Section 3

Section 4

Women's doubles

Seeds

 Daniela Macías / Dánica Nishimura (quarterfinals)
 Ariel Lee / Sydney Lee (quarterfinals)
 Michelle Tong / Josephine Wu (final)
 Ines Castillo / Paula la Torre Regal (semifinals)

Finals

Top half

Section 1

Section 2

Bottom half

Section 3

Section 4

Mixed doubles

Seeds

 Daniel la Torre Regal / Dánica Nishimura (quarterfinals)
 Leodannis Martínez / Tahimara Oropeza (quarterfinals)
 Mathew Fogarty / Isabel Zhong (second round)
 Artur Silva Pomoceno / Fabiana Silva (third round)
 Matheus Voigt / Jaqueline Lima (third round)
 Andres Lopez / Cynthia Gonzalez (semifinals)
 Jonathan Solís / Diana Corleto Soto (semifinals)
 Bruno Barrueto Deza / Fernanda Saponara Rivva (third round)

Finals

Top half

Section 1

Section 2

Bottom half

Section 3

Section 4

References

External links
Official website
TournamentSoftware.com: Individual Results
TournamentSoftware.com: Team Results

Pan Am Badminton Championships
Pan Am Badminton Championships
Badminton tournaments in Trinidad and Tobago
International sports competitions hosted by Trinidad and Tobago
Badminton tournaments in Guatemala
International sports competitions hosted by Guatemala